Simon Nora (21 February 1921 – 5 March 2006) was a senior functionary in the post-war French state administration, who served in several French cabinets and was the Inspecteur-general in the Ministry of Finance.

Life and career
Nora was the eldest son of Gaston Nora, head of urology at the Rothschild Hospital. The family was secular, fully integrated into the Parisian Jewish bourgeoisie. His youngest brother is the historian Pierre Nora. During WW2, his father, who had formed a friendship with the influential Pétainist Xavier Vallat dating back to their days together in the trenches in World War I remained in Paris while sending his family away to avoid persecution and deportation. Simon joined the French Resistance in 1942, and was active in the areas of Jura and Vercours. After the armistice he frequented members of the former Vichy School of Uriage, which, after the régime had dissolved it, attracted numerous promising youths, who shared a contempt for the Third Republic and an intense desire to develop a new model for France.

In 1947, he married Marie-Pierre de Cossé-Brissac, despite his own father's concerns, and humiliating efforts by his future father-in-law, the Duke de Cossé-Brissac, to block their marriage on the grounds of Nora's social inferiority. They had two children, Fabrice and Constance, before their marriage ended in 1955. In 1953 he became economics expert for the newly-founded centre-left weekly L'Express He then married Léone Georges-Picot, secretary and chief of staff of Pierre Mendès France's government.

Acknowledged as a brilliant administrative functionary, Nora was close to Mendès France, an association that, according to his brother Pierre, became a recurrent obstacle throughout his later career under Charles de Gaulle, Georges Pompidou, François Mitterrand and Jacques Chirac. He was asked by President Valéry Giscard d'Estaing, who had once been Léone Nora's fiancé, to write on the impact of the new communications technology on France. The report, The Computerization of Society, co-written with Alain Minc, appeared in 1978 and became a best-seller in France. The report was one of the first to propose an information highway, one result of which was the Minitel program.

In his later years, while working desultorily on a massive treatise that aspired to be a kind of Kapital of the 20th century, he studied Judaism together with Buddhism. He died of pancreatic cancer in 2006 without completing his book. Widely admired, his memory as a modernizer was commemorated a decade later with a posthumous Festschrift in his honour, Simon Nora: moderniser la France.

Notes

Citations

Sources

1921 births
2006 deaths
Commandeurs of the Légion d'honneur
Deaths from cancer in France
École nationale d'administration alumni
French military personnel of World War II
French politicians